BMARC (British Manufacture and Research Company) was a UK-based firm designing and producing defence products, particularly aircraft cannon and naval anti-aircraft cannon. It was based on a  site on Springfield Road (part of the A607) in Grantham, Lincolnshire.

History

Second World War
Created and funded under the Air Ministry's Shadow factory plan headed up by Herbert Austin, the company was founded by William Denis Kendall. Shortly after start-up during the Second World War rearmament period, Kendall became MP for Grantham from 1942 to 1950.

By 1943, its two production units fulfilled 46% of the UK's demand for the Hispano-Suiza 20 mm cannon. The remainder came from The Birmingham Small Arms Company Limited (BSA) shadow factory in Newcastle-under-Lyme, 25%; Poole Royal Ordnance Factory, 25%; and the Royal Small Arms Factory Enfield, 3%. At the time of the Battle of Britain in 1940, 20 mm cannon were only just starting to arm the Spitfire and Hurricane. By 1943, the RAF had converted entirely to cannon armament for its fighters. Grantham received 21 raids by the Luftwaffe for precisely this reason, which killed 70 people in 1941-2 (many around the Commercial Road and Norton Street area on 9 January and 4 February in 1941). One notable raid was on 24 October 1942 when 30 people were killed when bombs destroyed most of Stuart Street and its air-raid shelter. The Ministry of Aircraft Production site on Springfield Road was hit on 27 January 1941, when a plane was shot down. The factory was also attacked in daylight on 3 December 1940, but the plane was damaged by the 3rd Kesteven (Grantham and Spittlegate) Battalion who had an anti-aircraft battery at the factory.

The 1942 morale-raising film The Foreman Went to France was based on an employee of the Grantham factory. Melbourne Johns, from Pembrokeshire, was working at the Grantham factory and realised in 1940 that the Hispano-Suiza factory in France had important Deep Hole Boring Machines that could be of immense value to the Germans and set out on a mission with a team to recover the equipment. Finding the French factory and local village deserted, they drove the equipment back to England on a lorry. Melbourne Johns died in Grantham in 1955. The Deep Hole Boring Machine (DHBM), used for drilling the barrels of the guns, in the Grantham factory was very valuable, and was encased in a specially-made bomb-proof shelter.

Post-war

In 1974, the company acquired a  site at Faldingworth, near Market Rasen which had two indoor firing ranges for testing and proving of cannon (Oerlikon 20 mm cannon). The site also had the capability to store nuclear weapons such as Redbeard and WE.177. This site is currently used by BAE Systems. The company also made the Oerlikon 30 mm twin cannon (GCM).

BMARC was a subsidiary of Hispano-Suiza (Suisse), S.A. in Geneva and then was owned from 1970 to 1987 by Oerlikon, the Swiss defence contractor. It was then sold to British Astra Holdings, which had a head office in Kent, in May 1988. In the 1990s, the company was investigated for alleged illegal dealings with Iraq. Jonathan Aitken was a non-executive director of the company from September 1988, and in a libel trial in March 1997, BMARC was accused of selling weapons to Iran. On 11 December 1995, an ITV World in Action programme covered the subject and the Scott Report. It was extensively (and exclusively) investigated by the Guardian newspaper, largely motivated by the potential to discredit (and later convict) Jonathan Aitken.

Financial collapse
On 4 February 1992, after owing £50 million, Astra went into receivership. In Britain, it also owned the pyrotechnics company Haley & Weller (who made grenades). After the financial collapse of Astra Holdings, in April 1992 BMARC was bought by British Aerospace, briefly becoming part of Royal Ordnance. The company closed the Grantham site later in 1992, and the site was sold in 1994.

Royal Navy use

Current use of the site
The former site's offices are now home to the Springfield Business Park, with the rest of the factory part developed for housing. South Lincolnshire Enterprise Agency was based there.

References

External links

 Faldingworth site
 Statement to Commons by Michael Heseltine Jun 1995
 Listen to a BBC documentary about BMARC/Astra.
 20mm weapon on HMS Cumberland

Video clips
 Dennis Kendall in 1945

1992 disestablishments in England
Companies based in Grantham
Defence companies of the United Kingdom
Defunct manufacturing companies of the United Kingdom
Firearm manufacturers of the United Kingdom
Manufacturing companies disestablished in 1992
Science and technology in Lincolnshire
Manufacturing companies established in 1937
British companies established in 1937
1937 establishments in England